Huntley is a surname or, more rarely, a given name that may refer to:

Surname
Brian Huntley (born 1944), South African scientist
Caleb Huntley (born 1998), American football player
Chet Huntley (1911–1974), American television newscaster
David Huntley (born 1957), Canadian lacrosse player and coach
Dennis Huntley (born 1928), British sculptor
Elias DeWitt Huntley (1840–1909), Methodist clergyman who served as Chaplain of the US Senate
Florence Huntley (1861–1912), American journalist, editor, writer
Francis Huntley (c.1787–1831), English actor
Fred Huntley (1862–1931), London-born American silent film actor and director
George Huntley (musician), American singer, guitarist and songwriter
George Huntley (MP)
Henry Vere Huntley (1795–1864), English naval officer and colonial administrator
Horace Huntley (born 1942), American professor
Jason Huntley (born 1998), American football player
Jessica Huntley (1927–2013), Guyanese-born British publisher and women's rights activist
John Huntley (cricketer) (1883—1944), Australian-born New Zealand cricketer
John Huntley (film historian) (1921–2003), British film historian, educator and archivist
Joni Huntley (born 1956), American athlete
Joseph Huntley, 19th century English biscuit maker
Keith Huntley (1931–1995), Welsh footballer
Kevin Huntley (American football) (born 1982), American and Canadian football defensive end
Kevin Huntley (lacrosse) (born 1985), Canadian lacrosse player
Lewis Huntley, co-founder of the city of DeKalb, Illinois
Noah Huntley (born 1974), English actor
Raymond Huntley (1904–1990), English screen actor
Richard Huntley (born 1972), Professional American football running back
Robert Huntley (born 1929), American attorney, businessman and retired law professor
Russell Huntley, co-founder of the city of DeKalb, Illinois
Shirley Huntley (born 1938), American politician
Storm Huntley (born 1987), Scottish Television presenter 
Thomas Huntley (born 1938), American politician
Tyler Huntley (born 1998), American football player
Victoria Hutson Huntley (1900–1971), American artist and printmaker
Wade Huntley, American activist
William A. Huntley, American composer, banjoist, music teacher

Given name
Huntley Bakich (born 1972), American College football linebacker
Huntley Gordon (1887–1956), Quebec-born American actor
Huntley Gordon (racing driver) (1883—1967), American racing driver
Huntley N. Spaulding (1869–1955), American manufacturer and politician from New Hampshire
Huntley Wright (1868–1941), English stage and film actor, comedian, dancer and singer

See also
Huntley (disambiguation)
Hundley (surname)
Hunley (surname)

References